Turkish-occupied territories may refer to:
Northern Cyprus - area under military control of Turkey since 1974 war
Turkish occupation of Northern Syria - areas under military control of Turkey since 2016 operation during Syrian Civil War

Military occupation